Germany introduced postal codes on 25 July 1941, in the form of a two-digit system that was applied initially for the parcel service and later for all mail deliveries. This system was replaced in 1962 in West Germany by a four-digit system; three years later East Germany followed with its own four-digit system. Whereas the Federal Republic introduced a system with space left for the East German postal system after a possible reunification, such as by omitting all codes starting with '1' (except 1000 for West Berlin) and '9', the German Democratic Republic had a system that used all codes starting from '1' to '9' just for East Germany.

Today, German postal codes are numeric and have consisted of five digits since 1993. Between 1990 and 1993 the previous four-digit codes in the former West were prefixed with the letter "W", and in the former East with the letter "O" (for "Ost", "east" in German). Even though the western system had kept some number ranges free, specifically for later integration of the East in case of reunification, it was decided that the time was right to create an entirely new system for the 1990s, in which larger towns and cities would be divided into multiple postal code areas (the old system had inconsistently used additional numbers after the city's names), and companies receiving large amounts of post (such as mail-order businesses) could be assigned their own private code. This resulted in a system where one could no longer identify the size of the city by the number of trailing zeros in its postal code (such as 2000 for Hamburg or 8000 for Munich).

Post office boxes are arranged in racks containing several dozens of them. Each rack is identified by an individual postal code.

The 1993 system has geographic zones on the first (Postleitzonen) and on the second level (Postleitregion), e.g., 1 is North East Germany, and 10 is a zone in the inner city of Berlin.

 
On 31 December 2007, the zones had the following area and population:

There are three states (Saxony, Saarland and Schleswig-Holstein), in addition to the city states (Berlin, Bremen and Hamburg), that lie completely within one postal zone, while three states (Lower Saxony, Saxony-Anhalt and Baden-Württemberg) cover four postal zones.

See also
 Briefzentrum (Deutsche Post)

External links 
Find town or P.O. box by postal code and in reverse order

Germany
Postal system of Germany